SBCC may refer to:

Communication

 Social and Behavior Change Communication

Construction
State Building Code Council, Washington State

Geography
Santa Barbara City College
Campo de Provas Brigadeiro Velloso, a military base in Pará, Brazil
Cachimbo Airport, the airport at the base

Medicine
Superficial Basal cell carcinoma (sBcc)